The Lost Remixes is a compilation album by rapper/singer T-Pain. It was released on December 4, 2020 by RCA and Nappy Boy Records. This contains unreleased verses, live performances, and remixes of hit songs that never fully released on streaming sites or that were released on original CDs. This album also commemorates the 15th anniversary of T-Pain's debut album "Rappa Ternt Sanga.

Track listing 
All tracks produced by T-Pain, except where noted.

References 

T-Pain albums
Albums produced by T-Pain
2020 greatest hits albums